The 2013 Missouri Tigers football team (also called "Mizzou") represented the University of Missouri in the 2013 NCAA Division I FBS football season. It marked the Tigers' second season as a member of the Southeastern Conference (SEC) in the Eastern Division. The team was led by head coach Gary Pinkel, in his 13th year and played its home games at Faurot Field in Columbia, Missouri.  The Tigers went into the season hoping to return to a bowl game after missing out the previous season.  They succeeded after an 11–1 regular season and their first-ever SEC Eastern Division title. After a loss to Auburn in the SEC Championship Game they played in the 2014 Cotton Bowl Classic on January 3, 2014 against Oklahoma State, which they won 41–31. The two teams had last met on October 22, 2011.

Recruits
Key losses:

 DT Sheldon Richardson
 DE Brad Madison
 WR T. J. Moe
 OL Trey Foster
 OL Jack Meiners
 RB Kendial Lawrence

All 20 recruits signed their National Letter of Intent on February 6, during the National Signing Period (February 6 – April 1).

On the eve of National Signing Day, Missouri ranks last in the SEC, 46th in the overall rankings according to Rivals.com.On the day after National Signing Day, Scout.com ranks Missouri as 36th (3.00) best overall, ahead of only Kentucky (39th) in the SEC.Rivals.com has Mizzou at 39th (3.00).

Coach Pinkel likes the 20-name recruiting class.

His coaching staff agrees with his analysis, as does former Mizzou wide receiver Jeremy Maclin.

Mizzou's class has 11 of the 20 recruits from Missouri. In 2011, Mizzou had 19 recruits, and in 2010, only 17.

The team added a needed defensive tackle, DeQuinton Osborne on May 31, 2013, but MU has not officially announced Osborne's addition to the recruiting class.

Four recruits of the 20 (listed in the recruit section below) left the program for various reasons. Freshman offensive tackle Harneet Gill left the Missouri football team three days into preseason camp after deciding he had “lost faith in the plan” to treat his surgically repaired foot and that Mizzou was not “the right fit,” he said. Tailback Chase Abbington (Fort Zumwalt South) and defensive lineman Antar Thompson (Maplewood Richmond Heights) both failed to qualify academically and enrolled in junior college. Duron Singleton, a safety from Fresno City, CA, Community College, was expected to transfer and arrive last week, but Pinkel announced Thursday that Singleton wasn't joining the program, citing undisclosed “personal reasons.”

Schedule

Mizzou Tigers, schedule , as of December 8, 2013 (Retrieved: December 8, 2013)

Recruits for 2013

Honors
On December 9, 2013, defensive end Michael Sam was named the SEC Defensive Player of the Year by the Associated Press, and was also a unanimous first-team All-SEC selection. Before the bowl season starts, Sam led the SEC with 10.5 sacks and 18 tackles for loss. Offensive tackle Justin Britt was also named to the first-team AP all-conference, as was defensive lineman Kony Ealy, and cornerback E.J. Gaines.  Wide receiver Dorial Green-Beckham and linebacker Andrew Wilson were named to the second-team list. Defensive end Markus Golden made the honorable mention list. Ealy had the strongest finish to the regular season of any Mizzou defender and heads into bowl season with 7.5 sacks, 12.5 tackles for loss, a team-best 14 hurries and three forced fumbles, the most among all SEC defensive lineman. Gaines finished the regular season with 68 tackles and a team-best four interceptions. In the December 7 loss to Auburn in the SEC title game, he picked up a fumble forced by Ealy, and returned it for a touchdown. He also earned first-team All-Big 12 honors as a sophomore in 2011. With a huge game against Auburn, Green-Beckham now shares the team lead with 55 catches for 850 yards and a team-best 12 touchdowns. Wilson leads Mizzou in tackles for a third straight season with 98, matching his 2011 total. Coach Gary Pinkel is one of eight finalists for the Eddie Robinson Coach of the Year award.

Michael Sam named a Walter Camp Football Foundation First-Team All-American, the seventh for Coach Pinkel in his 13 years at Mizzou, and the first on the defensive side for Mizzou since Justin Smith in 2000.

Rankings

Missouri cracked the AP poll (#25) on October 6, for the first time since the second week of the 2011 season when it was ranked #21.
Missouri jumped nine slots to #5 in the AP poll on October 19, after their 36–17 win over #22 Florida. The #5 ranking is Missouri's highest since reaching No. 3 in 2008 at 5–0 before a home loss to Oklahoma State. They debuted at #5 in the BCS standings.
They reached #5 again on the AP poll on Nov. 24, after beating #24 Ole Miss, 24–10, at Oxford the day before, and stayed at #5 on all four polls after beating Texas A&M on Nov. 30. The Tigers fell to #9  after its 42–59 loss to the Auburn Tigers in the 2013 SEC Championship Game on December 7, ending its bid for a possible trip to the BCS National Championship Game. The 2013 Tigers team is the fourth in the past seven years to reach double-digits in wins, with the previous time a 10–3 record in 2010. Missouri ended the SEC season with an 11–2 record. Mizzou extended its nation-leading streak of games forcing a takeaway to 43 consecutive games. Mizzou has jumped on top of opposing teams on the scoreboard all season, only trailing at the half for the second time this season vs. Auburn. The 8th ranked (BCS) Tigers were invited to and accepted an invitation to the 78th Cotton Bowl against the (10–2) #13-ranked Oklahoma State Cowboys on January 3, 2014, 7pm CT, to be televised on Fox. The Cotton Bowl appearance will mark Mizzou's 11th New Year's Day (or later) bowl game in program history, and its first since playing in the 2008 Cotton Bowl against the Arkansas Razorbacks. The invitation is a reward for an outstanding season which saw the Tigers post one of the top turnaround years in the nation, going from 5–7 in 2012 to 11–2 – a 6-1/2 game improvement. This is MU's 30th alltime bowl appearance. The Tigers will be making their third appearance in the tradition-rich game. Mizzou rolled to a 38–7 win over Arkansas in the 2008 game, as TB Tony Temple rushed for a Cotton Bowl-record 281 yards and four touchdowns against the 25th-ranked Razorbacks. That win closed a stellar season for Mizzou, who finished with a 12–2 record and a school-best final ranking of 4th in the final polls. Mizzou's other appearance in the Cotton Bowl was back in 1946, when Texas claimed a 40–27 victory.

Coaching staff

Henson expected to take over as Missouri's offensive coordinator

Source: 2013 Mizzou Football Roster (coaches)

Roster
SUMMER 2013 (as of August 30, 2013) 
(Preseason depth chart)

References

Missouri
Missouri Tigers football seasons
Cotton Bowl Classic champion seasons
Missouri Tigers football